Joseph F. Donoghue (February 11, 1871 – April 1, 1921) was an American speed skater. He became the speed skating World Champion in 1891 and was a member of the Manhattan Athletic Club.

Biography
Joe Donoghue skated on ice-skates with longer irons than did the other skaters in his time. This gave him an advantage because he did not need to swing with his arms.

Joe Donoghue came from a family of skaters. His father Timothy Donoghue was an American champion in 1864 and a pioneer skate designer, and of his sons Timothy Jr, Joe and James competed as speed skaters. In 1889, at age 18, Joe Donoghue traveled to Russia where he raced against the Russian champion Alexander Panshin.

Timothy Donoghue Sr on skating techniques in windy or windless conditions and the difference between Joe Donoghue's and Alexander Panshin's skating in the February 10, 1889 issue of the Pittsburg Dispatch (page 11): 

"A good skater will always have the wind against him, for he goes faster than an ordinary breeze. Going before the wind a man can make 33 per cent better time than on a calm day. When the wind is against a man it is desirable to present as little surface to it as possible. For this reason I have taught the boys to skate with their arms folded behind them. With our long skate we make long strokes. Von Panschin, in spite of his size, makes 30 strokes to Joe's 20 while they are skating."

World records 

Source: SpeedSkatingStats.com

References

External links
Joe Donoghue at SpeedSkatingStats.com

1871 births
1921 deaths
American male speed skaters
Sportspeople from Newburgh, New York
World Allround Speed Skating Championships medalists